Heavy Engineering Corporation Limited or "HECL" is a Public Sector Undertaking ("PSU") in Ranchi, Jharkhand, India. HECL was established in the year 1958  as one of the largest Integrated Engineering Complex in India. It manufactures and supplies capital equipments & machineries and renders project execution required for core sector industries. It has complete manufacturing set up starting from casting & forging, fabrication, machining, assembly and testing - all at one location, Ranchi, backed by a strong design - engineering and technology team.

HECL's Plants
It consists of the following units:

Heavy Machine Building Plant (HMBP)
The Plant has a fenced area of 5,70,000 square metres and a floor area of nearly 2,00,000 sq.m. It is engaged in design and manufacture of equipment and components for steel plant, mining, mineral processing, crushers, material handling, cranes, power, cement, aluminium, space research, nuclear power, etc.It is the most important part of HEC.it consists of many type of huge machine,like leth machine,drill machine, compressor etc.

Heavy Machine Tools Plant (HMTP)
Set up in collaboration with M/s Skodaexport Czechoslovakia, HMTP produces machine tools in heavier ranges. The Plant covers an area of over 2,13,500 sq.m. It designs and manufactures medium & heavy duty CNC and conventional Machine Tools for Railways, Defense, Ordnance Factories, HAL, Space and other strategic sectors.

Foundry Forge Plant (FFP)
It is the largest foundry and forging complex in India and one of the largest of its kind in the world. The area of the Plant is 13,16,930 sq.m accommodating 76,000 tonnes of installed machinery to cope up with the various operations effectively. This plant is the manufacturer of heavy castings and forgings for various HEC make equipment and related to steel plant, defence, power, nuclear energy, etc. Manufacturer of forged rolls for steel plants, crank shafts for railway locomotives, etc.

Projects Division
Design, engineering and execution of turnkey projects related to bulk material handling, steel plant projects, cement plant and other sectors.

HECL's Products

Steel Plant and its equipment
 Blast Furnace
 Coke Oven Batteries
 Continuous Casting Machine
 Steel Melting Converters
 Forged Rolls

Mining equipment

 Hydraulic shovel (5 CuM)
 Electric Rope Shovel (5 CuM)
 Electric Rope Shovel (10 CuM)
 Draglines (20/90 and 24/96)
 P.G. Crusher

Crushing equipment and mineral processing products

 Primary Gyratory Crusher
 Cone Crusher
 Four Roll Crusher
 Reversible Hammer Crusher
 Rod Mill
 Machine Tools
 Vertical Turning & Milling Machine
 Lathe
 Roll Grinding Machine
 Deep Hole Boring Machine
 Horizontal boring machine
 Radial Drilling Machine
 Planning Machine
 Plano Milling Machine

Castings and forgings

 Steel Castings
 Steel Forgings
 Grey Iron Castings
 Non-Ferrous Castings

Crane

 Crane
Heavy crane

HECL's Quality Policy
“To achieve and maintain a leading position as supplies of reliable quality products, systems and services to meet customer needs and expectations”

Last Full Time Board of Directors

Dr Nalin Shinghal 
Chairman cum Managing Director

Sh Shakil Kumar Manocha 
Director (Production)

Sh Shakil Kumar Manocha 
Director (Marketing)

Sh A K Behera
Director (Personnel)

Sh Rajesh Kumar Dwivedi                   
Director (Finance)

Abhay Kumar Kanth
Company Secretary

References

External links
Official website

A fourth division "Project Division" has achieved milestones in this company.
It is currently working in following major project:-
1) New Coal Handling Plant, Bhilai Steel Plant
2) Augmentation of Ore Handling Plant, Bhilai Steel Plant
3) Ore Blending and Bedding Plant, Rourkela Steel Plant
4) Madhuband NLW Coal Washery Project, Dhanbad

Almost 4 new projects are in line.
Efficient engineers are committed for its design, erection and commissioning.

Engineering companies of India
Companies based in Ranchi
Government-owned companies of India
1958 establishments in Bihar
Indian companies established in 1958